Papyrus Oxyrhynchus 127 (P. Oxy. 127 or P. Oxy. I 127) is an account of contributions of wheat sent annually to Alexandria and Constantinople, written in Greek and discovered in Oxyrhynchus. The manuscript was written on papyrus in the form of a sheet. The document was written in the late 6th century. Currently it is housed in the Egyptian Museum (10084) in Cairo.

Description 
The recto side of the manuscript contains an account of the contributions made by the oikoi (οἶκοι) of Oxyrhynchus and Cynopolis towards the annual wheat supply (ἐμβολή) sent to Alexandria and Constantinople.  The verso side is a list of payments in two columns. The measurements of the fragment are 250 by 239 mm.

It was discovered by Grenfell and Hunt in 1897 in Oxyrhynchus. The text was published by Grenfell and Hunt in 1898.

See also 
 Oxyrhynchus Papyri
 Papyrus Oxyrhynchus 126
 Papyrus Oxyrhynchus 128

References 

127
6th-century manuscripts
Byzantine manuscripts
Egyptian Museum